Mexican redknee tarantula is a common name for several spiders and may refer to:

Brachypelma hamorii
Brachypelma smithi